The St. Vincent de Paul Chapel is a Catholic chapel that serves the Hospice of St. Vincent de Paul in Jerusalem. It is dedicated to the founder of the Daughters of Charity who also run a hospital and an adjoining nursery. This is one of the largest Catholic churches in the city. The sisters are present in the Holy Land since 1884.

The chapel was built in the Romanesque Revival style. The nave is delimited by Neo-Romanesque pillars from the side aisles.

See also
Roman Catholicism in Israel
St. Vincent de Paul Church (disambiguation)

References

Roman Catholic churches in Jerusalem
Roman Catholic chapels in Jerusalem
Mamilla